Reeves College is a private for-profit post-secondary facility with five campuses in Alberta, Canada. The college specializes in training students for business, art and design, legal and health care related careers in under two years. Programs are developed in direct consultation with the business and health care communities to satisfy industry demands for certain skill sets. The college continuously accepts applications for enrollment in the next session of each certified career program.

Campus locations

Calgary City Centre 
Calgary North 
Edmonton  
Lethbridge
Lloydminster

History
Reeves College was founded in 1961 in Lloydminster, Alberta by C.J. Reeves. Reeves developed secretarial programs based on his experiences as a secretary and instructor. Programs were designed to train the whole individual. Therefore, key curriculum elements included practical skill development (typing, dictation, etc.) as well as professionalism and personal deportment. The college quickly gained a reputation for cultivating knowledgeable business office professionals as local businesses began hiring Reeves College graduates.

In 2003, the Eminata Group purchased Reeves College and introduced health care career programs. In 2004, Reeves College opened a campus in downtown Edmonton, Alberta. The Calgary campus opened in 2006. In 2008, the college opened a second campus in Calgary and a campus in Lethbridge

Programs
Some of the more popular programs include:
Legal Assistant (Paralegal)
Graphic Design
Addictions and Community Service Worker
Business Administration Management
Digital, Social Media & Web Marketing
Health Care Administration
Hospitality Management
Accounting and Payroll Administrator
Education assistant program

Affiliations

Reeves College offers vocational training licensed under the Private Vocational Schools Act. Additionally, the college holds membership with the Alberta Association of Career Colleges (AACC) and the National Association of Career Colleges (NACC).

External links
Reeves College

Educational institutions established in 1961
Colleges in Alberta
1961 establishments in Alberta
Eminata Group
For-profit universities and colleges in Canada